St Mary the Virgin is the parish church of Monken Hadley. It is located in the Diocese of London.

History

The church was rebuilt in its present form in 1494 (the date being carved in stone over the west door) possibly after incurring damage during the battle of Barnet in 1471.  A church is believed to have stood on the site for over 800 years.  The present building is in the Perpendicular style, and included two side chapels (in transepts) dedicated to St Anne and St Catherine. The building was heavily renovated by the architect G. E. Street in Victorian times, and contains large quantities of Victorian woodwork furniture. The parish and church were heavily influenced by tractarianism and the Oxford Movement, and it remains a focus of eucharistic worship within the surrounding district. The church maintains a strong choral tradition.

Of the two side chapels, only that of St Catherine is still in use today; it was restored in 1958. The former chapel of St Anne now houses the church organ.

There is a well-preserved monument by Nicholas Stone to Sir Roger Wilbraham (died 1616),  Solicitor-General for Ireland, his wife  Mary  Baber and their three daughters.

The church has been grade II* listed since 1949.

The tower of the church, at the west end, contains nine bells which are in good order and regularly rung, eight being hung for change ringing, and the ninth as a sanctus bell. At the top of the tower there is a signal beacon, part of an ancient series of signal beacons. The church markets itself under the title "The Beacon Church", and the beacon has become a symbol of the local area, and forms the badge of the nearby Church of England primary school.

It was the model for another Church of Saint Mary the Virgin, built in 1904 in Chappaqua, New York, United States.

See also
 Church View and Church Cottages

References

External links

 
Diocese of London
Grade II* listed churches in London
Grade II* listed buildings in the London Borough of Barnet
History of the London Borough of Barnet